Bicyclopropenyl (bicycloprop-2-enyl, C6H6) is an organic compound and one of several valence isomers of benzene. The molecule can be described as two coupled cyclopropene units. The positions of the alkene groups can vary and therefore two other isomers are known: bicycloprop-1,2-enyl and bicyclopropen-1-yl.

The synthesis of all three isomers was reported in 1989 By Billups and Haley. The 3,3 isomer was formed in two steps by reaction of 1,4-bis(trimethylsilyl)buta-1,3-diene with methyllithium and dichloromethane, introducing two cyclopropane rings into the molecule. The bis(2-chloro-3-(trimethylsilyl)cyclopropan-1-yl) formed is reacted with TBAF. In this latter reaction fluoride couples to the trimethylsilyl group, in the process forming the double bond and forcing the chlorine atom to leave as chloride. In presence of silver ions bicycloprop-2-enyl rearranges to Dewar benzene. The compound can also be trapped by cyclopentadiene. Above -10 °C it decomposes with polymerization.

An X-ray crystal structure has been reported. The bond length for the central bond is short by 1.503 Ångström (150.3 pm).

The other two isomers are increasingly unstable. Bicycloprop-1-enyl can only be detected in trapping experiments.

Derivatives can be much more stable, for example perfluorohexamethylbicyclopropenyl that must be heated to 360 °C to be as unstable.

References

Bicyclic compounds
Cyclopropenes